Sexton's Burrows is a narrow rocky peninsula which forms a natural breakwater to the Harbour of Watermouth Bay on the North Devon coast.

 

Headlands of Devon